The 2022 Atlanta Open was a professional tennis tournament played on hard courts. It was the 34th edition of the tournament, and part of the 2022 ATP Tour. It took place at Atlantic Station in Atlanta, United States between July 24 and 31, 2022.

Champions

Singles 

  Alex de Minaur def.  Jenson Brooksby, 6–3, 6–3

Doubles 

  Thanasi Kokkinakis /  Nick Kyrgios def.   Jason Kubler /  John Peers, 7–6(7–4), 7–5

Points and prize money

Point distribution

Prize money 

*per team

Singles main-draw entrants

Seeds

 1 Rankings are as of July 18, 2022.

Other entrants
The following players received wildcards into the main draw:
  Andres Martin
  Ben Shelton 
  Jack Sock

The following players received entry from the qualifying draw:
  Taro Daniel 
  Peter Gojowczyk 
  Dominik Koepfer
  Ramkumar Ramanathan

The following players received entry as lucky losers:
  Steve Johnson
  Adrian Mannarino

Withdrawals
  Maxime Cressy → replaced by  John Millman
  Taylor Fritz → replaced by  Thanasi Kokkinakis
  Miomir Kecmanović → replaced by  Denis Kudla
  Nick Kyrgios → replaced by  Adrian Mannarino
  Andy Murray → replaced by  Kwon Soon-woo
  Cameron Norrie → replaced by  Jordan Thompson
  Reilly Opelka → replaced by  Steve Johnson

Doubles main-draw entrants

Seeds

1 Rankings are as of July 18, 2022.

Other entrants
The following pairs received wildcards into the doubles main draw:
  Andrei Duarte /  Álvaro Regalado Pedrol
  Christopher Eubanks /  Mackenzie McDonald

The following pair received entry as alternates:
  Quentin Halys /  Adrian Mannarino

Withdrawals
  Ariel Behar /  Gonzalo Escobar → replaced by  Gonzalo Escobar /  Hunter Reese
  Maxime Cressy /  Mackenzie McDonald → replaced by  Quentin Halys /  Adrian Mannarino
  John Peers /  Filip Polášek → replaced by  Jason Kubler /  John Peers
  Julio Peralta /  Ramkumar Ramanathan → replaced by  Hans Hach Verdugo /  Ramkumar Ramanathan

References

External links 
 

Atlanta Open
2022
Atlanta Open
Atlanta Open
Atlanta Open
Atlanta Open